Northern Illinois Huskies basketball may refer to either of the basketball teams that represent Northern Illinois University:
Northern Illinois Huskies men's basketball
Northern Illinois Huskies women's basketball